Muyanja Mbabaali is a Ugandan politician.

Mbabaali was originally announced as the Member of Parliament for Bukoto County South, Lwengo District, following the 2011 general election. His election was however nullified by the High Court, with the unseating party citing the fact that he did not possess the required academic qualifications for the position. He was also nominated as State Minister for Investments in the Ugandan Cabinet but was rejected by the parliamentary vetting committee after accusations his academic papers were forged.

References

Living people
Government ministers of Uganda
Members of the Parliament of Uganda
National Resistance Movement politicians
Year of birth missing (living people)
21st-century Ugandan politicians